The Sims Castaway may refer to:

 The Sims 2: Castaway
 The Sims Castaway Stories